Arthur H. Marshall was the first person to successfully reach the highest point in every U.S. state. In 1936, Marshall completed this goal by visiting Hoosier Hill in Indiana for his 48th highpoint.  Marshall began his journey by climbing Mount Rainier in Washington in 1919. Being a lifelong bachelor, Marshall found the time to travel to reach a mountain or hill. Marshall worked for the railway and did not drive, so he would reach each point by travelling at a discount by railway to the nearest station and would then hire a driver to take him as close as possible via roadway.

After completing the initial goal, Marshall travelled back to Arkansas as there were two high points of equal height. Marshall travelled miles through the woods to reach the last one.

References 

American mountain climbers